Mamacita (stylized as MAMACITA) is the seventh Korean studio album (eighth overall) of South Korean boy band Super Junior. It was released on September 1, 2014, by SM Entertainment and was released online on August 29, 2014.  This is their first Korean album since Sexy, Free & Single was released in 2012. On October 16, 2014, it was announced that a special version of the album, named This is Love, would be released on October 23, 2014.

The album features 10 members, marking the return of members Leeteuk and Heechul after their mandatory military service. It features the vocals of Yesung in some songs, who was in mandatory military service during the production of the album.

Background
The group went on hiatus for two years and one month while waiting for their leader, Leeteuk who was serving in mandatory military service. In 2013 and the beginning of 2014 the sub-units Super Junior-M and Donghae & Eunhyuk actively worked on their own albums and touring, while the full group successfully completed their World Tour Super Show 5 and achieved some accolades and records overseas.

With the discharge of Leeteuk coming sooner, the members of the group started to hint they were recording a new album and also some of them updated their SNS with pictures in the recording studio. A week before the discharge of Leeteuk, they also uploaded a picture of the full group rehearsing together, causing great excitement. One of the pictures revealed that the famous choreographer Tony Testa was working with them.

It was announced in August 2014 that the group would be making their comeback later that month with a full album and new world tour Super Show 6.  The title of the album was revealed, increasing the anticipation, with around forty teaser images released in the following days. Finally the group released an image video teaser with a Western storyline, a music video teaser showcasing parts of the choreography and the chorus of the song and a Highlight Medley of the studio album.

Production & composition 
The album is full of new sounds, different beats, old school R&B and pop music. It was revealed that Teddy Riley, Jason J. Lopez and Yoo Young-jin worked on the title track, which is described as an "urban new jack swing track with an Indian percussion base and piano melody that is reminiscent of a DJ remix."

The album has a total of 10 songs, and features composers Don Spike, Team One Sound and Hitchhiker. Band member Donghae contributed music and lyrics to the song 'Shirt,' and also 'Islands' which is about the group's friendship and loyalty. Band member Siwon also wrote the lyrics to ‘Don't Leave Me’, which was found on the repackaged album.

Promotion

Release
Super Junior held a press conference at the Imperial Palace Hotel in Gangnam, Seoul on August 28, 2014. A few hours later, the official music video was released and it quickly reached one million views in less than 9 hours and two million views in less than 22 hours. It ended up being the most viewed k-pop music video of August 2014 despite being released at the end of the month. On the Chinese site YinYueTai Super Junior became the second group on achieve a perfect 100.00 score for the music video (Super Junior-M's Swing music video, being the first one).

On August 29 at 00:00 (KST) the album was released in digital format in South Korea. Over the next few days, it also became available through iTunes for oversea fans. The physical version of the album was available for pre-order a week before and became sold out in Synnara Store. On September 1 the album hit the stores and peaked at No. 1 in charts right away, despite a controversy with an error in the second print run of the album.

Live performance
The group made their comeback performance on the Korean music show Music Bank with the songs "Shirt" and "Mamacita" on August 29 and kept promotions going on Music Core, Inkigayo and M! Countdown. On September 10 the group did two fan signing events at different locations in Seoul.

Super Show 6
Super Junior kicked off their third World Tour on September 19 at Seoul. The tickets for the first dates in their hometown were sold out in just 9 minutes, and the group celebrated their 100th concert on September 21. They also confirmed five stops in Japan as well, in Tokyo Dome and Osaka Dome.

Critical reception
Billboard released an article about Super Junior's new album highlighting the experimental variety of music styles. The website Critical Kpop also named 'Mamacita' a front-runner for album of the year in the 2014's K-Pop industry, praising it as "Every song on Mamacita fits seamlessly together, and more revealing, every song on Mamacita is better for being included together, in this smooth, sophisticated, funky package. Now that's an album". Allkpop also praised the album writing that composers "crafted a pretty masterful piece of work here" and giving them a 9,0 score overall.

Commercial performance 
The album hit the No. 1 spot on Hanteo chart, making it the best selling of the week with more than 65,000 copies sold. It became No. 1 on iTunes in many countries such as HongKong, Philippines, Singapore and Thailand and placed in the Top 10 in many countries such as Japan, Indonesia and México. The album topped Billboard's Album World Chart with just three days of sales, selling 1,000+ copies according to Nielsen SoundScan.

Super Junior also ranked high in other domestic charts in Asia, coming in at No. 1 on KKBOX Weekly chart in Taiwan and Hong Kong, No. 2 on Tower Records chart and No. 3 on Oricon charts, Japan.

Track listing

Personnel 
Credit for Mamacita are adapted from the album.

 S.M Entertainment Co., Ltd – Executive Producer
 Soo-man Lee – Producer
 Nam Soo-young – Director of Management
 Jung Chang-hwan – Director of Media Planning
 Lee Song-soo, Kwon Yoon-jung, Yoon Ji-hae – A&R Direction & Coordinator
 Park Hae-in, Kim Dong-hoo, Cho Min-kyung, Lee Seo-kyung – International Repertoire 
 Jung Hyo-won, Kim Min-kyung, Oh Jung-eun, Park Mi-ji – Publishing & Copyright Clearance
 Vocal director – Yoo Young-jin
 Super Junior: Leeteuk, Heechul, Yesung, Kangin, Shindong, Sungmin, Eunhyuk, Donghae, Siwon, Ryeowook and Kyuhyun – Vocals, background vocals 
 Yoo Young-jin – Recorded at S.M. Boomingsystem
 Goo Joung-pil – Recorded at S.M. Yello Tall Studio
 Kim Chol-Sun – Recorded at S.M. Blue Ocean Studio
 Yoo Young-jin – Mixing (mixing done at S.M. Boomingsystem)
 Nam Koong-jin – Mixing at S.M. Concert Hall Studio
 Goo Jong-pil – Mixing at S.M. Yello Tall Studio
 Kim Cheol-sun – Mixing at S.M. Blue Ocean Studio
 Jang Eui-seok – Mixing at S.M. Blue Cup Studio
 Kim Han-goo – Mixing at Sound Pool Studio
 Jeon Hoon – Mastering (mastering done at Sonic Korea)

 Tak Yeong-jun, Kang Byeong-jun, Wan Young-sun, Kim Min-gun, Kim Si-young, Song In-ho, Park Yeong-suk – Artist Management and Promotion
 Lee Seong-Soo, Yoon Hee-jun, Cho Yoo Eun – Artist Planning & Development
 Kim Eun-ah, Jung Sang-hee, Lee Ji-sun – Public Relations & Publicity
 Kim Min Suk, Park Min-Kwon, Jung Kyung-sik – Media Planning
 Tak Young-jun, Hwang Sung-young, Beat Burger (Joe Sim, Greg Hwang) – Choreography Direction
 Toni Testa, Beat Burger (Joe Sim, Greg Hwang) – Choreographer 
 Choi Jung-min – International Marketing
 Steven Myungkyung Lee – English lyrics Supervisor 
 Lee Jung-ah – Customer Relationship Management
 Park Jun-young, Sun Young, Jun Sung-jin – Music Video Direction
 Min Hee-jin – Visual & Art Director
 Han Jung-cul – Photographer
 Cho Oh-chul, Yoon Jung-yoon, Kim Yae-min – Design
 Lee Won-hae (want) – Stylist
 Kim Jung-eun, Kim Hye-yun, Yae Won-sang, Kwak Dong-woo – Hair Stylist
 Choi Hye-rin, Han Hyoo-eun, SO Hyun-joo – Make-up Artist
 Young-min Kim – Executive Supervisor

Charts

Weekly charts

Monthly charts

Year-end charts

Album sales

Release history

Awards

Listicles

See also
 Mamacita 
 
 
 
 
 
 Music Video Event!!
 
 
 
 
 
 
 
 
 This Is Love x Evanesce

References

External links
 Super Junior official homepage  
 Super Junior official YouTube channel

2014 albums
Super Junior albums
SM Entertainment albums
Korean-language albums